Joonas Ikäläinen (born 5 January 1982) is a Finnish football player currently playing for PS Kemi; he formerly played for PS Kemi, TP-47, VPS and RoPS.

External links
  at rops.fi
  at veikkausliiga.com

1982 births
Living people
Finnish footballers
Association football central defenders
Veikkausliiga players
Rovaniemen Palloseura players
People from Kemi
TP-47 players
Sportspeople from Lapland (Finland)
21st-century Finnish people